Yawkey may refer to:

Communities
 Yawkey, West Virginia, an unincorporated community in Lincoln County, West Virginia

People
 Yawkey (surname)

Places

Massachusetts
 Yawkey Athletics Center, on the campus of Boston College in Chestnut Hill, Massachusetts
 Yawkey station, the former name of Lansdowne station in Boston, Massachusetts
 Yawkey Way, the former name of a two-block section of Jersey Street in Boston, Massachusetts

Wisconsin
 Cyrus C. Yawkey House, a historic structure in Wausau, Wisconsin
 Leigh Yawkey Woodson Art Museum, in Wausau, Wisconsin
 William H. Yawkey Boathouse, a historic structure in Hazelhurst, Wisconsin

Other
 Yawkey Baseball League of Greater Boston, an amateur baseball league in New England

See also